The Mile High Miracle is both the NFL 2012 AFC Divisional playoff game between the Baltimore Ravens and Denver Broncos on January 12, 2013, and its defining play, a game-tying 70-yard touchdown pass from Baltimore quarterback Joe Flacco to receiver Jacoby Jones with under a minute left in regulation.  Playing on the road against the heavily favored Broncos, who had decisively defeated the struggling Ravens late in the regular season while on an 11-game winning streak, Flacco and the Ravens forced the Peyton Manning-led Broncos into double overtime, when rookie kicker Justin Tucker kicked a 47-yard field goal to secure a 38–35 win. With 28 points scored in the first eleven minutes of the game, three return touchdowns, five lead changes, and single-digit temperatures, the game was described by Sports Illustrated as "one of the most exciting and entertaining postseason games in NFL history." The Ravens would go on to beat the New England Patriots, and two weeks later, defeat the San Francisco 49ers in Super Bowl XLVII for the franchise's second championship.

The Mile High Miracle was ranked #1 on NFL.com's Top 20 NFL Games of 2012. The game was described as "a contest that had everything: two special teams touchdowns, two bombs for scores and a pick-six – all without disintegrating into one of those nobody-can-stop-anybody affairs. The defenses did not play poorly; this was not a track meet. It had some balance."

As of 2022, it is the 4th-longest game in NFL history, and the most recent NFL game to go into double overtime. It is often considered the greatest NFL game of the 2010s, and one of the greatest games of all time.

Background

Baltimore Ravens

On December 16 the Ravens hosted the Broncos in a week 15 matchup with post-season implications. Denver took an early 10-0 that the Ravens would not be able to close. An opportunity for the Ravens to make their way back into contention for the game came late in the second half, but was eliminated when Broncos' cornerback Chris Harris returned a red zone pass from Joe Flacco 98 yards for a touchdown.  Baltimore would ultimately suffer a 34-17 defeat in what would be the team's worst home field loss of the John Harbaugh era.

Though the Ravens would receive the consolation prize of a guaranteed playoff berth later that day, due to a loss by the Pittsburgh Steelers, the team's recent performance (extending a three game losing streak) led to criticisms of Joe Flacco specifically, and generally about the team's strength after having lost key defensive players due to injuries earlier in the season—to include star linebacker Ray Lewis. Lewis publicly announced his plans to retire shortly after, which buoyed fan support and rallied team morale. Baltimore would finish the season as the divisional champions with a 10-6 record and resurgent momentum going into the post-season, then defeated the Indianapolis Colts in the Wild Card round.

Denver Broncos

After the blockbuster signing of Peyton Manning during the off season; the Broncos started slowly, losing three of their first five games, including a week 2, 27–21 loss vs the Atlanta Falcons at the Georgia Dome. In that game, Manning struggled in front of a Monday Night Football audience, as he was intercepted three times in the first quarter. After the loss to the New England Patriots in week 5, they wouldn't lose another game for the rest of the 2012 regular season. They won their final eleven games, including an improbable come back win in Qualcomm Stadium against their AFC West rival, the San Diego Chargers, on a week 6 MNF showdown. They also defeated the Baltimore Ravens 34–17 on week 15 at M&T Bank Stadium. On December 12, they clinched the AFC West division championship with a win over the Tampa Bay Buccaneers, and achieved a first round bye & home field advantage on the 30th, with a win over the Kansas City Chiefs, and were helped by the Indianapolis Colts, who defeated the Houston Texans earlier that day.

Game summary

First quarter
The temperature at kickoff was 13 °F (−10.6 °C) with a wind chill of 2 °F, making it the coldest playoff game ever played in Denver, which forced Broncos quarterback Peyton Manning to wear gloves.

Following a Ravens punt on their opening possession, Broncos wide receiver Trindon Holliday scored first by returning a Sam Koch punt 90 yards for a touchdown, the first postseason punt return score in franchise history. Things seemed to get even better for Denver when Ravens receiver Jacoby Jones fumbled the ensuing kickoff and was downed on the 6-yard line. However, two plays later, on a Ravens third down, Broncos defensive back Tony Carter was called for defensive pass interference, giving the Ravens 25 yards and a first down. Ravens quarterback Joe Flacco then tied the game with a 59-yard touchdown pass to Torrey Smith. The situation only got worse for Denver on the next drive when Corey Graham intercepted a Manning pass tipped by Eric Decker and returned it 39 yards for a touchdown, giving the Ravens a 14–7 lead. At the end of the quarter, Manning rallied his team back, completing 5/7 passes for 69 yards on a 74-yard drive that ended on his 15-yard touchdown pass to Brandon Stokley, tying the game at 14-14 going into the second quarter.

Second quarter
Late in the second quarter, a 32-yard reception by Broncos receiver Eric Decker set up Manning's 14-yard touchdown pass to running back Knowshon Moreno. Denver then forced a punt and, on the ensuing possession, drove to the Ravens' 34-yard line. However, the Broncos failed to score as Matt Prater's foot hit the ground during a 52-yard field goal attempt, causing the field goal to miss wide, leaving the Broncos without points on the drive and giving the ball back to the Ravens. Taking the ball back on their own 42 with 1:16 remaining, Flacco hit Anquan Boldin for 11 yards and tight end Dennis Pitta for 15 yards before finding Torrey Smith in the end zone on a 32-yard score, tying the score at 21 at the end of the half.

Third quarter
Holliday quickly broke the tie just 13 seconds into the third quarter by returning the second half kickoff 104 yards for a touchdown, making him the first player ever to return both a punt and a kickoff for a touchdown in a postseason game. Later in the quarter, Manning lost a fumble while being sacked by Pernell McPhee, and Ravens lineman Paul Kruger recovered it on the Broncos' 37-yard line. The play was reviewed because of the tuck rule, but referee Bill Vinovich upheld the ruling on the field that the result of the play was a fumble. This play became the last play ever reviewed under the tuck rule since it was abolished in 2013. Running back Ray Rice took it to the end zone from there with five consecutive running plays (one of them for 32 yards), the last one a 1-yard touchdown run to tie the game back up at 28.

Fourth quarter
Midway through the fourth quarter, Denver drove 88 yards and scored on a 17-yard pass from Manning to Demaryius Thomas, taking a 35–28 lead with just over seven minutes left in regulation. Baltimore responded with a drive to the Broncos 31-yard line, but turned the ball over on downs with 3:16 left. The Ravens defense had to use all their timeouts on Denver's ensuing drive, but managed to force a punt and get the ball on their own 23-yard line at the 1:09 mark.  Flacco then threw an incomplete pass and scrambled for seven yards, setting up third-and-three from the Baltimore 30-yard line with 44 seconds remaining.

70-yard touchdown pass
The Ravens went out with a three wideout set, with Boldin and Smith to the left and Jones out right. Tight End Dennis Pitta was also lined up in the slot while Flacco was back in the shotgun.  Expecting an obvious pass play, the Broncos played seven defensive backs, including safeties Rahim Moore, Mike Adams, David Bruton, and Jim Leonhard.

When the play began the Broncos would rush three defenders.  Elvis Dumervil successfully pushed Ravens left tackle Bryant McKinnie into the backfield.  Robert Ayers would manage to spin past center Matt Birk and right guard Marshal Yanda, gaining penetration through the gap between Yanda and right tackle Michael Oher. Meanwhile, Von Miller would soon shed Oher's block.  To avoid the defenders Flacco would be forced to step forward into the pocket, then slide to his left, and ultimately throw the ball earlier than intended.  Flacco's preference is to bail out to a deep route.  Accordingly, he sent the ball down field for Jones to chase down.

Broncos cornerback Tony Carter was assigned both to jam Jones at the line of scrimmage, and then to follow Jones up the sidelines if there was no eligible receiver in the flat.  He failed on both counts.   This left Moore and Leonhard to defend Jones' route.  But with both defensive backs expecting Flacco to throw for the first down marker, neither was well positioned to defend a deep pass.  Moore had been assigned the deepest zone, but on his way to the ball he made a bad read on the flight of the ball attempting to leap and try knocking the pass away, falling down in the process.  Jones caught the ball at the 20 yard line and made it to the end zone unimpeded.

Overtime periods
After the first three drives of overtime ended in punts, Corey Graham made his second interception of a pass from Manning intended for Stokley on the Broncos 45-yard line. On the last play of the first overtime period, Rice's 11-yard run moved the Ravens into field goal range. Four plays later, rookie kicker Justin Tucker kicked a 47-yard field goal to win the game.

Statistics

Notable performances

Joe Flacco
The game was hailed as a breakout performance for Flacco, who had "outgunned" Tom Brady and Peyton Manning in back-to-back postseason trips.  The Associated Press ran an article stating "Welcome to NFL immortality, Joe Flacco," and compared his 70-yard touchdown pass to Roger Staubach's Hail Mary and Franco Harris's Immaculate Reception.  ESPN analyst and former quarterback Ron Jaworski said, "That was certainly one of the most remarkable throws in Ravens history and one of the best throws I've ever seen."  According to ESPN Stats & Information’s win probability model, Denver had a 97.2 percent chance of winning the game prior to the touchdown.  Retiring linebacker Ray Lewis said of Flacco, "He grew up today," and noted that before the game he had told his quarterback, "'You're the general now.  Lead us to victory.  You lead us today.  I'm just here to facilitate things.'"  Flacco threw for 331 yards and three touchdowns, with no interceptions and a fumble that he lost.

Torrey Smith
Ravens wide receiver Torrey Smith, matched up against all-Pro cornerback Champ Bailey, caught three passes for 98 yards, his two touchdowns on receptions over twenty yards.  The Broncos defense had allowed only three such touchdowns all season.

Corey Graham
Ravens cornerback Corey Graham finished with eight tackles and two interceptions, the first he returned 39 yards for a touchdown, and the second in overtime, which led to the Ravens game-winning field goal. He was also named the "CBS Player of the Game" for his performance.

Peyton Manning
Manning finished 28/43 for 290 yards and three touchdowns, with two interceptions (one of which being the 39 yard pick-six by Graham) and two fumbles, one that he lost.

Jacoby Jones
Jacoby Jones was on the receiving end of the "Mile High Miracle" play that forced the game into overtime. Jones finished the game with 2 receptions for 77 yards and 1 touchdown, plus 74 return yards on kickoff and punt returns.

Trindon Holliday
Holliday's 90-yard punt return and 104-yard kickoff return were the longest ever in each NFL postseason category (with the latter broken just three weeks later by Jacoby Jones in Super Bowl XLVII). His 248 total special teams return yards were an NFL postseason record as well, breaking Andre Coleman's record of 244 return yards in Super Bowl XXIX (and later tied by Desmond Howard in Super Bowl XXXI).

Starting lineups
The starting lineups for the game were:

Officials 
Referee: Bill Vinovich (#52)
Umpire: Undrey Wash (#96)
Head Linesman: George Hayward (#54)
Line Judge: Ron Marinucci (#107)
Field Judge: Bob Waggoner (#25)
Side Judge: Ronald Torbert (#62)
Back Judge: Billy Smith (#2)

Aftermath and legacy
The Ravens went on to avenge the previous year's AFC Championship Game loss to the New England Patriots with a 28–13 win and went on to defeat the San Francisco 49ers (coached by Jim Harbaugh, the brother of Ravens coach John Harbaugh) in Super Bowl XLVII, 34–31. Jacoby Jones continued his postseason success in the Super Bowl with a touchdown reception and a kick-off return for a touchdown. Following the season, he competed on the sixteenth season of Dancing with the Stars. He was the highest-placed male contestant and came in third overall behind winner Kellie Pickler and runner-up Zendaya.

The loss made a disappointing end for the Broncos, for whom there were high hopes after Manning's comeback season and an 11-game winning streak. Manning was criticized for throwing a pair of interceptions in his eighth time exiting a postseason without a win, tying him with Brett Favre for the most career post-season losses by a starting quarterback. Broncos head coach John Fox was blamed for his "ultra conservative" playcalling, particularly for not using the two-minute drill. Nearing the end of the first half, with the game tied and three time-outs available, Fox had Manning hand the ball off to his running back before running out the clock. At the end of regulation, with 2:30 remaining, Fox called three running plays up the middle and after the Jones' touchdown, made Manning take a knee with 31 seconds to play in regulation and 2 timeouts remaining.

At 76 minutes and 42 seconds, the game is the 4th-longest in NFL history and was the sixth double overtime game in history, the first since the 2003 NFC Divisional playoff game between the St. Louis Rams and the Carolina Panthers, which coincidentally also featured head coach John Fox.

By virtue of winning Super Bowl XLVII, the Ravens were scheduled to host the Kickoff Game on Thursday, September 5, 2013. However, due to a scheduling conflict with the Baltimore Orioles (with whom they share a parking lot), the Ravens were the first Super Bowl champions in 10 years not to host the following year's Kickoff Game. The 2013 Kickoff Game was instead played at Sports Authority Field at Mile High in a rematch with the Broncos and resulted in a 49–27 win for the Broncos where Manning threw a record 7 touchdown passes.

After the 2018 season, which saw Flacco lose the Ravens starting quarterback job to Lamar Jackson, he would be traded to the Broncos.

References

External links 
 
 NFL Game Center

2012 National Football League season
National Football League playoff games
Denver Broncos postseason
Baltimore Ravens postseason
American football incidents
January 2013 sports events in the United States
2013 in sports in Colorado
2010s in Denver
Nicknamed sporting events